"Chopped 'n' Skrewed" is the second single released from R&B singer-songwriter T-Pain's third album, Thr33 Ringz. The song features American rapper Ludacris. It was first released on the Canadian iTunes on September 22, 2008, the same day the song was also added to T-Pain's MySpace. It was released in the US on iTunes on September 30.

The official remix features American singer R. Kelly.

Background
The song has a futuristic beat and creates different scenarios about men being misled and blown off by women. The title and style of the song refers to the chopped and screwed genre of music created in Texas. It also features the autotune feature to produce its static and powerful beat.

T-Pain performed the song on Saturday Night Live on November 22, 2008 with Ludacris, along with "One More Drink". At the 2008 BET Hip-Hop Awards, T-Pain and Ludacris performed the song along with Lil Wayne. The instrumental of the song was used in a commercial bumper on Adult Swim, which T-Pain is associated with.

Music video
The video, which features elements from "Can't Believe It", was expected to be released on October 14, along with the single release of the album's third single "Freeze", according to the iTunes Store countdown to Thr33 Ringz. However it was released on October 12 and can be viewed on T-Pain's YouTube account. The video features a cameo from DJ Khaled and Sophia Fresh.

Remixes
The song was mashed up with The Pains of Being Pure At Heart by The Hood Internet. A remix of the song which featured R. Kelly was leaked on the Internet. There is also a remix by S.U.C. It is featured on Swishahouse mixtape Final Chapter 8.

Chart positions

Weekly charts

Year-end charts

In the U.S., "Chopped 'n' Skrewed" was certified Gold by the RIAA, signifying sales of over 500,000 singles.

References

2008 singles
2008 songs
T-Pain songs
Ludacris songs
Song recordings produced by T-Pain
Songs written by T-Pain
Songs written by Ludacris